Reeth is a village  west of Richmond in the Richmondshire district of North Yorkshire, England, in the civil parish of Reeth, Fremington and Healaugh. Historically part of the North Riding of Yorkshire, it is the principal settlement of upper Swaledale.

Etymology

The origin of the name Reeth is unclear. It is possibly derived from the Germanic for 'place by the stream', although this claim can neither be confirmed nor refuted.  Reeth could also have been derived from the Cumbric rith (cf. ryd in Modern Welsh, rys in Cornish ), meaning 'Ford'. Either would make sense as Reeth is located near two shallow rivers.

History
In Saxon times, Reeth was only a settlement on the forest edge, but by the time of the Norman conquest it had grown sufficiently in importance to be noted in the Domesday Book. Later it became a centre for hand-knitting and the local lead industry was controlled from here, but it was always a market centre for the local farming community.

Built in 1783, The Burgoyne (named after Mrs Burgoyne Johnson) stands majestically on Reeth's idyllic green, the late Georgian county house hotel is full of history and elegant charm with many of its original features. The hotel previously known as Hill House, was made into guest accommodation and then a hotel after WW2. May Sinclair features Hill House in her novel, The Three Sisters, as the home of Miss Kendal.  The "Swaledale Walk 5 May Sinclair's Reeth", is a short walk that takes you around and above Reeth to discover pivotal places featured in two of her novels.

On 5 July 2014, the Tour de France Stage 1 from Leeds to Harrogate passed through the village.

Governance

The village lies within the Richmond (Yorks) parliamentary constituency, which has been represented since 2015 by Conservative Rishi Sunak, who took over from retiring fellow Conservative William Hague. It also lies within the Upper Dales electoral division of North Yorkshire County Council and the Reeth and Arkengarthdale ward of Richmondshire District Council.

Geography

Reeth is located on the B6270 road that crosses the entirety of Swaledale, linking Richmond with Kirkby Stephen in Cumbria. Reeth is situated at the meeting point of the two most northerly of the Yorkshire Dales: Swaledale and Arkengarthdale. It is also near to Reeth that Arkle Beck from the north joins the River Swale. The village is overlooked by the surrounding fells of Harkerside Moor, Fremington Edge and Calver Hill.
Alfred Wainwright's Coast to Coast Walk, an unofficial but popular long-distance footpath from Saint Bees to Robin Hood's Bay, passes through Reeth.

Demography
For the parish of Reeth, Fremington and Healaugh:

Community and culture

Primary education is provided by Reeth Community Primary School, which is engaged in a confederation with nearby Gunnerside Methodist Primary School. Pupils then receive secondary education at Richmond School & Sixth Form College.

In May and June every year Reeth becomes the hub of the Swaledale Festival, a two-week celebration of music and guided walks. Unfortunately it had to be cancelled in 2020 owing to Coronavirus.  Additionally on the final Wednesday of August the Reeth Show, an agricultural event, is held.  In 2012 it celebrated its centenary.

Reeth is also home to the Swaledale Museum, which covers rural history including life and work in the local area of Swaledale and Arkengarthdale within the Yorkshire Dales National Park.

Amenities 

Village amenities include three public houses (the Black Bull Hotel, the Buck Hotel and the King's Arms), a caravan and camp site, a village shop and post office, two bakeries, a cafe, eleven guest houses variously bed and breakfast or self-catering, two hotels (The Burgoyne Hotel), a community centre, the Evangelical Congregational Church, Reeth Memorial Hall and the Swaledale Museum.

One of five National Park Centres for the Yorkshire Dales is located in Reeth. The local health establishment is Reeth Medical Centre, which serves more than 200 square miles and more than 1,500 patients.

Reeth is home to the Reeth Dales Craft Centre, there are 12 units containing Artists, an Artisan Cheese Maker, a shoemaker, metalworker and several Fibre Arts outlets supplying wool and yarn related products and accessories, the Craft Bakery has won several awards.

Religion

Reeth is home to two churches. The current Reeth Methodist Chapel has been in use since 1822, although Methodists have been worshipping in the village since at least 1766. The larger Reeth Evangelical Congregational Church is located on the village green.

Notable people
 The nonconformist minister David Bradberry was born in Reeth.
 Ruby Ferguson, a writer of popular fiction including children's books, romances and mysteries, was born and brought up in Reeth.
 Arthur Shepherd, M.P. for Darlington 1926-1931, was Headmaster of Reeth School from 1922 until his election to the House of Commons.

References

External links
 
 Reeth Information from Reeth.org  as of early 2023 this site is not operational.
 Reeth Guide
 Swaledale Museum

Villages in North Yorkshire
Swaledale
Richmondshire